Frederick James Kirkwood (31 July 1890 – 18 August 1956) was an Australian rules footballer who played for Fitzroy and Essendon in the Victorian Football League (VFL).

From Surrey Hills, Kirkwood was a wingman in Essendon's 1912 premiership team, having spent the previous two seasons at Fitzroy. His final season in 1914 was marred by a four-game suspension for using "insulting language" at an umpire. Kirkwood later served in World War I.

References

External links

1890 births
1956 deaths
Fitzroy Football Club players
Essendon Football Club players
Essendon Football Club Premiership players
Australian rules footballers from Victoria (Australia)
Australian military personnel of World War I
One-time VFL/AFL Premiership players